"The Memphis Jazz Box" is a 3-CD box set by Memphis jazz artists, first released by Ice House Records in March 2004 and then re-released to the public in 2008.  Volume one and two have a combined 24 tracks from a wide variety of artists who were currently working in Memphis during the time the set was produced.  The third CD is the Jazz Orchestra of the Delta Big Band Reflections of Cole Porter recorded in 2003 for Summit Records.

Background

The Memphis tradition of jazz music dates back many years to the time of W.C.Handy, Jimmie Lunceford, and Phineas Newborn.  Memphis is a city with a long musical heritage that is an integral part of the American sound consisting of work songs, spirituals, blues, jazz, gospel, and rock and roll.   Through this tradition, Memphis is a music city that serves to foster musical talent that is unique.   There is a wide range a music on the CD set that represents the current flavor of what Memphis music is; from the traditional sounds to Joyce Cobb and W.C. Handy to the contemporary sounds of fusion with the band Voodoo Village.
This box set of three CD was produced commercially to promote the city and the jazz music generated from the Mid-south region.  This was the second such boxed set produced by Ice House Records and the Chamber of Commerce. The first set, produced in 2001, featured "Best Of. . ." tracks from Sun, Stax, and Hi Records.

Track listing

Recording sessions
 DISC ONE - The New Memphis Jazz Collection, volume one
Recorded completed in several studios in Memphis to include Ardent Studios, Young Avenue Sound, Sam Phillips Recording Services

 DISC TWO - The New Memphis Jazz Collection, volume two
Recorded completed in several studios in Memphis to include Ardent Studios, Young Avenue Sound, Sam Phillips Recording Services

 DISC THREE - Big Band Reflections of Cole Porter, Jazz Orchestra of the Delta
Please refer to the Recording sessions section on that Wikipedia/CD page.

Personnel

Musicians
 DISC ONE - The New Memphis Jazz Collection, volume one

 DISC TWO - The New Memphis Jazz Collection, volume two

Di Anne Price passed in March 2013.

Charlie Wood is married to Jacqui Dankworth and has moved to London since the release of this CD set.  He still retains a CD contract with Archer Records in Memphis, TN.

 DISC THREE - Big Band Reflections of Cole Porter, Jazz Orchestra of the Delta
Please refer to the Personnel Section on that Wikipedia/CD page.

Production
 Producer: John Threadgill
 Co-producer: Jack Cooper
 Manufactured: John Phillips, Select-O-Hits, 
 Mastered: L. Nix, Ardent Studios, Memphis, TN. 
 Graghic design & concept: Blake Franklin, Street Level Graphics, Memphis, TN.
 Liner notes: Jack Cooper
 Discs 1 and 2 - All tracks compiled by Jack Cooper
 Disc 3 - All tracks composed or arranged and produced by Jack Cooper

Promotion

The CD release party was held in AutoZone Park on March 18, 2004, at 5:30 pm., in the upper club room convention/party level: it was promoted well and The Commercial Appeal as well as the Memphis Business Journal.   The box was conceived through cooperation of the nonprofit Mid-south Jazz Foundation, the Greater Memphis Chamber of Commerce, the Shelby County/Memphis Music Commission, the University of Memphis School of Music, and Select-O-Hits.  Numerous artists from the CD set performed at the event, it was well attended and sponsored by the Greater Memphis Chamber of Commerce.  Interviews were done on WKNO-FM 91.1 and WUMR with the producer of the set, the tracks from the set have had extensive play on WUMR radio which is the jazz radio station for the Mid-South region.  It has also had airplay on other jazz radio stations around the country.

Reception 

 All Discs

"A new collection, The Memphis Jazz Box, states with classy pride the case for the Bluff City's jazz heritage, notably those currently working on the local scene...The box stands as a fine effort, a nice cross-section..."

Bill Ellis, Commercial Appeal  

 Disc #3

"...the result is a cohesive ensemble that understands (the) musical direction so well that they reproduce precisely what (the arranger) has intended...Balance and phrasing, suitable textures, and mellow harmonic ties follow with glamorous effects."

Jim Santella, L.A. Jazz Scene

"...(the arranger) is to be congratulated on the way he orchestrated some of (Porter's) best known songs, maintaining interest, despite the familiarity with the material."

Gordon Jack, Jazz Journal International

References

Sources and external links

 

2004 compilation albums
Jazz compilation albums
Jazz albums by American artists
Big band albums
Mainstream jazz albums